Women's March may refer to:

 Women's March on Versailles, a 1789 march in Paris
 Women's Sunday, a 1908 suffragette march in London
 Woman Suffrage Procession, a 1913 march and rally in Washington, D.C.
 Women's March (South Africa), a 1956 march in Pretoria, South Africa
 March for Women's Lives, a 2004 march in Washington, D.C.
 Women's Memorial March, an annual event held in Vancouver since 2009

Post-Trump Inauguration marches 
 2017 Women's March, a political rally that included marches in Washington, D.C., and subsequently worldwide
 List of 2017 Women's March locations outside the United States
 Women's March on Portland
 Women's March on Seattle
 2018 Women's March
 2019 Women's March
 2020 Women's March
 2021 Women's March
 2022 Women's March

See also 
 Women's strike